Paulyn Jean Buenaflor Rosell-Ubial (born June 29, 1962) is a Filipino physician who served as Secretary of Health on an ad interim basis under the Duterte administration. President Rodrigo Duterte nominated her in 2016, but the Commission on Appointments rejected her appointment in 2017.

She spent her entire career in public health and was an assistant secretary of the
Department of Health from 2008 to 2016.

Early life 
Paulyn Jean Buenaflor Rosell was born on June 29, 1962, in Iloilo City. Her father, Neon Rossell, was a zoology professor at the University of the Philippines Diliman (UP Diliman), while her mother was Maria Buenaflor. For elementary and high school, she attended the University of the Philippines Integrated School in Diliman. She then earned her Bachelor of Science degree in zoology from UP Diliman in 1983, and her Doctor of Medicine degree from the University of the East in 1987. She completed her internship at the Philippine General Hospital.

Her family owns a farm in M'lang, Cotabato. Her relatives, Rodolfo Buenaflor and Luigi Cuerpo, had served as mayors of the town.

Career

Department of Health
Ubial began her career as a volunteer rural physician in Kidapawan, Cotabato in 1988. The following year, she became a medical specialist for the Department of Health (DOH) and was assigned to Cotabato City. In 1990, she eventually became the assistant city health officer of Cotabato City. She was then assigned to the DOH headquarters in Manila in 1991, where she headed the Polio Eradication Unit. 
She also worked for other programs of the DOH, including the Communicable Disease Control Service and various women's health programs. From 2001 to 2005, she was the assistant regional director of the Western Visayas Center for Health Development, and was later promoted to regional director of Davao Center for Health Development, serving from 2006 to 2008. In Davao City, she became acquainted with then-mayor Rodrigo Duterte.

From 2008 to June 2016, she was an Assistant Secretary of the DOH.

During her stint in Manila, she earned her Master of Public Health degree from UP Manila.

Secretary of Health
After Duterte won the 2016 presidential election, Ubial was named as the incoming Secretary of Health.

She is an anti-tobacco advocate. She helped author Executive Order 26, which bans smoking in enclosed public places and transportation servicing the general population, except in designated smoking areas.

The Commission on Appointments (CA) did not approve of Ubial's appointment as Health Secretary on October 10, 2017, ending her de facto tenure. Kabayan Representative Harry Roque, lawyer Restituto Mendoza, and Potenciano Malvar, medical director of the General Miguel M. Malvar Medical Foundation officially filed opposition to her appointment. Her dealings with PhilHealth was contentious, which led 150 of the organization's employees to oppose her appointment, citing her decision to suspend the allowances and salary adjustments of Philhealth's employees which caused "extreme demoralization". Former CEO and President of PhilHealth Hildegardes Dineros disputed the nature of his departure from Philhealth. He claimed that he was forcibly removed from his post by Ubial and did not voluntary resign as she claimed.

Later career
As of October 2020, Ubial is the head of the Philippine Red Cross biomolecular laboratories.

References

1962 births
Living people
Duterte administration cabinet members
Benigno Aquino III administration personnel
Arroyo administration personnel
Filipino public health doctors
Filipino civil servants
People from Cotabato
People from Iloilo City
Secretaries of Health of the Philippines
University of the East alumni
Women members of the Cabinet of the Philippines
Filipino women medical doctors
20th-century Filipino medical doctors
21st-century Filipino medical doctors
20th-century women physicians
21st-century women physicians
Women public health doctors